Alejandra Judith Laborda Ramos (born 2 December 1978) is a Uruguayan former footballer who played as a midfielder. She has been a member of the Uruguay women's national team.

Club career
Laborda has played for Rampla Juniors in Uruguay.

International career
Laborda capped for Uruguay at senior level during two Copa América Femenina editions (2003 and 2006).

International goals
Scores and results list Uruguay's goal tally first

References

1978 births
Living people
Uruguayan women's footballers
Women's association football midfielders
Uruguay women's international footballers